This is a list of state leaders in the 5th century (401–500) AD.

Africa

Africa: East

Kingdom of Aksum (complete list) –
Eon, King (c.400)
Ebana, King (f. 5th century)
Nezool, King (f. 5th century)
Ousas, King (c.500)

Africa: Northcentral

Vandal Kingdom (complete list) –
Genseric, King (428–477)
Huneric, King (477–484)
Gunthamund, King (484–496)
Thrasamund, King (496–523)

Americas

Americas: Mesoamerica

Maya civilization

Copán (complete list) –
K'inich Yax K'uk' Mo', King (426–c.437)
K'inich Popol Hol, King (c.437)
Ruler 3, King (c.455)
Ku Ix, King (c.465)
Ruler 5, King (c.476)
Muyal Jol, King (c.485)

Palenque (complete list) –
K'uk' Bahlam I, Ajaw (431–435)
Casper, Ajaw (435–487)
B'utz Aj Sak Chiik, Ajaw (487–501)

Teotihuacan –
Spearthrower Owl, Emperor (374–439)

Tikal (complete list) –
Yax Nuun Ahiin I, Ajaw (c.379–404)
Sihyaj Chan K'awiil II, Ajaw (411–456)
K'an Chitam, Ajaw (458–c.486)
Chak Tok Ich'aak II, Ajaw (c.486–508)

Asia

Asia: Central

Hephthalite Empire – 
Toramana, Tegin (c.490–515)

Rouran Khaganate (complete list) –
Yujiulü Shelun, Khan (402–410)
Yujiulü Hulü, Khan (410–414)
Yujiulü Datan, Khan (414–429)
Yujiulü Wuti, Khan (429–444)
Yujiulü Tuhezhen, Khan (444–450)
Yujiulü Yucheng, Khan (450–485)
Yujiulü Doulun, Khan (485–492)
Yujiulü Nagai, Khan (492–506)

Tibet (Yarlung Valley) (complete list) –
Tritog Jetsen, King
Thothori Nyantsen, King (5th century)
Trinyen Zungtsen, King

Gaochang
Kàn Bózhōu, ruler (460-477)
Kàn Yìchéng, ruler (477-478)
Kàn Shǒugūi, ruler (478-488/491)
Zhāng Mèngmíng, ruler (488/491-496)
Mǎ Rú, ruler (496-501)

Asia: East

China: Jin dynasty and Sixteen Kingdoms
Western Jin, China (complete list) –
An, Emperor (396–419)
Gong, Emperor (419–420)

Huan Chu –
Huan Xuan, Prince (403–404)

Later Liang –
Lü Zuan, Emperor (400–401)
Lü Long, Emperor (401–403)

Later Qin –
Yao Xing, Emperor (394–416)
Yao Hong, Emperor (416–417)

Later Yan –
Murong Sheng, Emperor (398–401)
Murong Xi, Emperor (401–407)
Gao Yun, Emperor (407–409)

Northern Liang –
Duan Ye, Prince (397–401)
Juqu Mengxun, Emperor (401–433)
Juqu Mujian, Emperor (433–439)

Northern Yan –
Gao Yun, Emperor (407–409)
Féng Bá, Emperor (409–430)
Féng Hóng, Emperor (430–436)

Southern Liang –
Tufa Lilugu, Prince (399–402)
Tufa Rutan, Prince (402–414)

Western Liang –
Li Gao, Prince (400–417)
Li Xin, Prince (417–420)
Li Xun, Prince (420–421)

Southern Yan –
Murong De, Prince (398–405)
Murong Chao, Prince (405–410)

Western Qin –
Qifu Chipan, Emperor (412–428)
Qifu Mumo, Emperor (428–431)

Xia –
Helian Bobo, Emperor (407–425)
Helian Chang, Emperor (425–428)
Helian Ding, Emperor (428–431)

China: Northern dynasties
Northern Wei (complete list) –
Daowu, Emperor (386–409)
Mingyuan, Emperor (409–423)
Taiwu, Emperor (424–452)
Tuoba Yu, Emperor (452)
Wencheng, Emperor (452–465)
Xianwen, Emperor (466–471)
Xiaowen, Emperor (471–499)
Xuanwu, Emperor (499–515)

China: Southern dynasties
Liu Song (complete list) –
Wu, Emperor (420–422)
Shao, Emperor (422–424)
Wen, Emperor (424–453)
Yuanxiong, Emperor (453–454)
Xiaowu, Emperor (454–464)
Qianfei, Emperor (465)
Ming, Emperor (465–472)
Houfei, Emperor (473–477)
Shun, Emperor (477–479)

Southern Qi (complete list) –
Gao, Emperor (479–482)
Wu, Emperor (483–493)
Xiao Zhaoye, Emperor (493–494)
Xiao Zhaowen, Emperor (494)
Ming, Emperor (494–498)
Xiao Baojuan, Emperor (499–501)

Japan
Japan, Yayoi period (complete list) –
Richū, Emperor (400–405)
Hanzei, Emperor (406–410)
Ingyō, Emperor (411–453)
Ankō, Emperor (453–456)
Yūryaku, Emperor (456–479)
Seinei, Emperor (480–484)
Kenzō, Emperor (485–487)
Ninken, Emperor (488–498)
Buretsu, Emperor (498–506)

Korea
Baekje (complete list) –
Asin, King (392–405)
Jeonji, King (405–420)
Guisin, King (420–427)
Biyu, King (427–455)
Gaero, King (455–475)
Munju, King (475–477)
Samgeun, King (477–479)
Dongseong, King (479–501)

Geumgwan Gaya (complete list) –
Isipum, King (346–407)
Jwaji, King (407–421)
Chwihui, King (421–451)
Jilji, King (451–492)
Gyeomji, King (492–521)

Goguryeo (complete list) –
Gwanggaeto, King (391–413)
Jangsu, King (413–490)
Munja, King (491–519)

Silla (complete list) –
Naemul, King (356–402)
Silseong, King (402–417)
Nulji, King (417–458)
Jabi, King (458–479)
Soji, King (479–500)
Jijeung, King (500–514)

Asia: Southeast

Cambodia
Funan (complete list) –
Zhāntán, King (c.357)
Qiáochénrú, King (c.420)
Chílítuóbámó, King (c.430–c.440)
Qiáochénrú Shéyébámó, King (484–514)

Indonesia
Indonesia: Java
Tarumanagara (complete list) –
Purnawarman, King (395–434)
Wisnuwarman, King (434–455)
Indrawarman, King (455–515)

Indonesia: Sumatra

Samaskuta Kingdom –
Prabhava Sangkala, King (c.416)

Kantoli –
Sri Varanarendra, King (c.460)

Indonesia: Kalimantan (Borneo)
Kutai Martadipura –
Mulavarman, King (c.400)

Malaysia: Peninsular

Old Pahang Kingdom –
Kudungga, Maharaja (mid 5th century)

Kedah Sultanate (complete list) –
DiMaharaja Putra, Maharaja (c.390–440)
Maha Dewa I, Maharaja (c.440–465)
Karna DiMaharaja, Maharaja (c.465–512)

Thailand
Lavo Kingdom –
Phraya Kalavarnadishraj, King (mid 5th century)

Vietnam
Champa (complete list) –
Bhadravarman I, King (380–413)
Gangaraja, King (early 5th century)
Manorathavarman, King (early 5th century)
Fan Diwen, King (410s–c.420)
Fan Yang Mai I, King (c.420–421)
Fan Yang Mai II, King (c.431–c.455)
Fan Shencheng, King (c.455–c.484)
Fan Danggenchun, King (c.484–c.492)
Fan Zhunong, King (c.492–c.498)

Asia: South

Northeast India

Kamarupa: Varman dynasty (complete list) –
Balavarman, King (398–422)
Kalyanavarman, King (422–446)
Ganapativarman, King (446–470)
Mahendravarman, King (470–494)
Narayanavarman, King (494–518)

India

Chalukya dynasty (complete list) –
Jayasimha, King (c.500–c.520)

Eastern Ganga dynasty (complete list) –
Indravarman I, King (496–535)

Western Ganga dynasty (complete list) –
Harivarman, King (390–410)
Vishnugopa, King (410–430)
Madhava III Tandangala, King (430–469)
Avinita, King (469–529)

Gupta Empire (complete list) –
Chandragupta II, Emperor (c.375–c.415)
Kumaragupta I, Emperor (c.414–c.455)
Skandagupta, Emperor (c.455–c.467)
Purugupta, Emperor (c.467–c.473)
Kumaragupta II, Emperor (c.473–c.476)
Budhagupta, Emperor (c.476–c.495)
Narasimhagupta Baladitya, Emperor (c.495–?)

Kadamba dynasty: Banavasi branch (complete list) –
Bhageerath, Maharaja (390–415)
Raghu, Maharaja (415–435)
Kakusthavarma, Maharaja (435–455)
Santivarma, Maharaja (455–460)
Shiva Mandhatri, Maharaja (460–475)
Mrigeshavarma, Maharaja (475–485)
Ravivarma, Maharaja (485–519)

Kadamba dynasty: Triparvatha branch (complete list) –
Krishna Varma I, Maharaja (455–475)
Vishnuvarma, Maharaja (475–485)
Simhavarma, Maharaja (485–516)

Maitraka dynasty (complete list) –
Bhatarka, Senapati (c.470–c.492)
Dharasena I, Senapati (c.493–c.499)
Dronasinha, Maharaja (c.500–c.520)

Pallava dynasty –
The Pallava dynasty has two chronologies of rulers.
Viravarman, King (385–400)
Skandavarman III, King (400–435/436)
Simhavarman II, King (435/436–460)
Skandavarman IV, King (460–480)
Nandivarman I, King (480–500/510)

Vakataka dynasty: Pravarapura–Nandivardhana branch (complete list) –
Damodarasena, King (400–440)
Narendrasena, King (440–460)
Prithivishena II, King (460–480)

Vakataka dynasty: Vatsagulma branch (complete list) –
Pravarasena II, King (400–415)
unknown king, (415–450)
Devasena, King (450–475)
Harishena, King (475–500)

Vishnukundina dynasty (complete list) –
Madhava Varma I, Maharaja (c.420–c.455)
Madhava Varma II, Maharaja (c.440–c.460)

Sri Lanka

Anuradhapura Kingdom (complete list) –
Upatissa I, King (370–412)
Mahanama, King (412–434)
Soththisena, King (434–434)
Chattagahaka Jantu, King (434–435)
Mittasena, King (435–436)
Pandu, King (436–441)
Parindu, King (441–441)
Khudda Parinda, King (441–447)
Tiritara, King (447–447)
Dathiya, King (447–450)
Pithiya, King (450–452)
Dhatusena, King (455–473)
Kashyapa I, King (479–497)
Moggallana I, King (497–515)

Asia: West

Persia
Persia: Sasanian Empire (complete list) –
Yazdegerd I, Shahanshah, King of Kings (399–420)
Shapur IV,§ Shahanshah, King of Kings (420)
Khosrau the Usurper,§ Shahanshah, King of Kings (420)
Bahram V, Shahanshah, King of Kings (420–438)
Yazdegerd II, Shahanshah, King of Kings (438–457)
Hormizd III, Shahanshah, King of Kings (457–459)
Peroz I, Shahanshah, King of Kings (459–484)
Balash, Shahanshah, King of Kings (484–488)
Kavadh I, Shahanshah, King of Kings (488–496)
Djamasp, Shahanshah, King of Kings (496–498)
Kavadh I, Shahanshah, King of Kings (498–496, 499–531)

Europe

Europe: Balkans
Roman Empire: East/ Byzantine Empire (complete list) –
Arcadius 
Junior Emperor (383–395)
Eastern Emperor (395–408)
Theodosius II, Eastern Emperor (402–450)
Pulcheria, Eastern Empress, Regent (450–453)
Marcian, Eastern Emperor (450–457)
Leo I, Eastern Emperor (457–474)
Leo II, Eastern Emperor (474)
Zeno
Eastern Emperor (474–475)
Emperor (476–491)
Marcus, Caesar/ Junior co-Emperor (475–476)
Basiliscus, Eastern Emperor (475–476)
Anastasius I, Eastern Emperor (491–518)

Europe: British Isles

Great Britain: Scotland

Dál Riata (complete list) –
Loarn, King (474–500)
Fergus Mór, King (500–501)
Kingdom of Strathclyde / Alt Clut (complete list) –
Ceretic Guletic, King (mid 5th century)
Cinuit, King (late 5th century)

Isle of Man (complete list) –
Tutagual Theodovellaunus, King (c.485–c.495)
Dingat, King (c. 495);

Great Britain: England

The Britons (complete list) –
Vortigern, King (c.425–452)
Riothamus, King (c.469)
Ambrosius Aurelianus, Leader (late 5th century)

Dumnonia (complete list) –
Erbin ap Constantine (c.443–c.480)
Geraint, King (c.480–c.514)
Kingdom of Kent –
Hengest, King (c.455–488)
Horsa, King (c.455–488)
Oisc, King (488–c.512)

Kingdom of Sussex (complete list) –
Aelle, King (c.477–c.514)

Great Britain: Wales

Kingdom of Ceredigion –
Ceredig, King (424–453)
, King (453–490)
, King (490–523)

Kingdom of Gwent (complete list) –
Iddon ap Ynyr, King (480–490)
Tewdrig, King (490–493/517)
Meurig ap Tewdrig, King (493/517–530–540)

Glywysing (complete list) –
Glywys, King (c.470–c.480)
Gwynllyw, ruler (c.480–523)
Pawl, ruler (c.480–540)
Mechwyn, ruler (c.480–c.500)

Kingdom of Gwynedd –
Einion Yrth ap Cunedda, King (c.470–500)
Cadwallon Lawhir ap Einion, King (c.500–534)

Kingdom of Powys (complete list) –
Vortigern, High King	
Cadeyern Fendigaid, King (c.430–447)
Cadell Ddyrnllwg, King (c.447–460)
Rhyddfedd Frych, King (c.480–500)
Cyngen Glodrydd, King (c.500–530)

Ireland

Ireland (complete list) –
These kings are generally though historical, but dates are uncertain and naming some High Kings may be anachronistic or inaccurate.
Niall Noígíallach, High King (generally thought historical: 4th–5th century)
Nath Í, High King (4th–5th century)
Lóegaire mac Néill, High King (5th century)
Ailill Molt, High King of Ireland (459–478)
Lugaid mac Lóegairi, High King of Ireland (479–503)

Europe: Central

Alamannia, tribal kingdom (complete list) –
Gibuld, petty king (fl.470)

Thuringia (complete list) –
Bisinus, King (450–500)

Europe: East
Kingdom of the Gepids
Ardaric, fl. c. 454
, fl. early 480s
, fl. 488

Huns (complete list) –
Octar, King (c.422–c.430)
Rugila, King (c.430–c.434)
Bleda, King (c.434–445)
Attila, King (c.434–453)
Ellac, King (453–c.455)
Dengizich, King (?–469)
Ernak, King (469–503)

Europe: Nordic
Agder (Norway) (complete list) –
Víkar, King (c.475–c.495)

Sweden (complete list) –
Ongentheow, King (c.490–515)

Europe: Southcentral

Roman Empire: West (complete list) –
Honorius, Western Emperor (395–423)
Stilicho, power behind the throne (395–408) 
Constantine III, usurper Emperor (407–411) 
Priscus Attalus, usurper Emperor (409–410, 414–415)
Jovinus, usurper Emperor (411–412)
Constantius III, Western Co-Emperor (421)
Valentinian III, Western Emperor (423–455)
Galla Placidia, Regent (423–433) 
Aëtius, Regent (433–454)
Joannes, usurper Emperor (423–425) 
Petronius Maximus, Western Emperor (455) 
Avitus, Western Emperor (455–456)
Ricimer, power behind the throne (456–472)  
Majorian, Western Emperor (457–461)
Libius Severus, Western Emperor (461–465)
Anthemius, Western Emperor (467–472)
Olybrius, Western Emperor (472)
Glycerius, Western Emperor (473–474)
Julius Nepos, Western Emperor (474–475, 476–480)
Romulus Augustus, Western Emperor (475–476)
Flavius Orestes, power behind the throne (475–476)

Ostrogoths –
Theodemir, King (470–474)

Ostrogothic Kingdom of Italy (complete list) –
Odoacer, King (476–493)
Theodoric I, King (493–526)

Lombards (complete list) –
Claffo, King (c.490–500)
Tato, King (c.500–510)

Europe: West

First Kingdom of Burgundy (complete list) –
Gebicca, King (late 4th century–c.407)
Gundomar I, King (c.407–411)
Giselher, King (c.411–?)
Gunther, King (?–437)
Gondioc, King (436–473) 
Chilperic I, King in opposition (443–c.480) 
Gundobad, King in Lyon and Burgundy (473–516)
Chilperic II, King in Valence (473–493) 
Gundomar/Godomar, King in Vienne (473–486) 
Godegisel, King in Vienne and Geneva (473–500)

Franks (complete list) –
Pharamond, King (c.410–426)
Clodio, King (426–447)
Merowig, King (447–457)
Childeric I, King (457–481)
Clovis I, King (481–509)

Kingdom of Galicia / Kingdom of the Suebi (complete list) –
Hermeric, King (409–438)
Rechila, King (438–448)
Rechiar, King (448–456)

Kingdom of Soissons – 
Aegidius, magister militum (457–464)
Syagrius, magister militum (464–486)

Vandals (complete list) –
Godigisel, King (359–407)
Gunderic, King (407–428)
His successor establishes the Vandal Kingdom in Africa

Visigothic Kingdom (complete list) –
Alaric I, King (395–410)
Ataulf, King (410–415)
Sigeric, King (415)
Wallia, King (415–419)
Theodoric I, King (419–451)
Thorismund, King (451–453)
Theodoric II, King (453–466)
Euric, King (466–484)
Alaric II, King (484–507)

Eurasia: Caucasus

Armenia: Arsacid dynasty (complete list) –
Vramshapuh, client King under Rome (389–417)
Artaxias IV, client King under Rome (422–428)

Kingdom of Iberia (Kartli) (complete list) –
Trdat, King (394–406)
Pharasmanes IV, King (406–409)
Mihrdat IV, King (409–411)
Archil, King (411–435)
Mihrdat V, King (435–447)
Vakhtang I Gorgasali, King (447–522)

See also
List of political entities in the 5th century

References 

Leaders
 
-